Tarasundari Balika Vidyabhaban is a Bengali-medium school for girls located in Howrah, India. The school was established in 1911.

References 

Schools in Howrah district
1911 establishments in British India
Educational institutions established in 1911